Tullamore, a division of King's County, was a UK Parliament constituency in Ireland, returning one Member of Parliament 1885–1918.

Prior to the 1885 United Kingdom general election and after the dissolution of Parliament in 1918 the area was part of the King's County constituency.

Boundaries
This constituency comprised the north-eastern part of King's County now known as County Offaly. It consisted of the baronies of Ballycowen, Coolestown, Geashill, Kilcoursey, Phillipstown Lower, Phillipstown Upper and Warrenstown.

Members of Parliament

Elections

Elections in the 1880s

Elections in the 1890s

Elections in the 1900s

Elections in the 1910s

References

Historic constituencies in County Offaly
Westminster constituencies in King's County (historic)
Constituencies of the Parliament of the United Kingdom established in 1885
Constituencies of the Parliament of the United Kingdom disestablished in 1918
Tullamore, County Offaly